The Alberta Liberal Party fielded 82 candidates in the 2008 provincial election.

Candidates elected
 Calgary-Buffalo: Kent Hehr
 Calgary-Currie: Dave Taylor
 Calgary-McCall: Darshan Kang
 Calgary-Mountain View: David Swann
 Calgary-Varsity: Harry B. Chase
 Edmonton-Centre: Laurie Blakeman
 Edmonton-Gold Bar: Hugh MacDonald
 Edmonton-Riverview: Kevin Taft
 Lethbridge-East: Bridget Pastoor

Incumbents defeated
 Calgary-Elbow: Craig Cheffins
 Edmonton-Decore: Bill Bonko
 Edmonton-Ellerslie: Bharat Agnihotri
 Edmonton-Glenora: Bruce Miller
 Edmonton-McClung: Mo Elsalhy
 Edmonton-Mill Woods: Weslyn Mather
 Edmonton-Rutherford: Rick Miller
 St. Albert: Jack Flaherty

Other candidates
Calgary-Lougheed: Lori Czerwinski
Calgary-North West: Dale Martin D'Silva
Calgary-Hays: Bill Kurtze
Cypress-Medicine Hat: Dick Mastel
Calgary-Mackay: Tianna Melnyk
Banff-Cochrane: Patricia Robertson
Calgary-Foothills: Mike Robinson
Calgary-Shaw: John Roggeveen
Calgary-Bow: Greg Flanagan

References

2008